Doryphora sassafras, commonly known as sassafras, yellow-, canary- or golden sassafras, or golden deal, is a species of evergreen tree of the family Atherospermataceae native to the subtropical and temperate rainforests of eastern New South Wales and Queensland, Australia. It is a tall tree with green foliage and contrasting white flowers which occur in Autumn and Winter.

Taxonomy
Doryphora sassafras was first described by Austrian naturalist Stephan Endlicher in 1837. Its generic name is derived from the Ancient Greek dory- "spear" and pherein "to carry", and refers to the anthers in the flower, while its specific epithet is taken from its similar odour to the North American Laurel (Sassafras albidum). It is a member of the small family Atherospermataceae along with several other Australian rainforest trees  including southern sassafras (Atherosperma moschatum).
Common names include Canary Sassafras, Yellow Sassafras, Golden Sassafras, Golden Deal or simply Sassafras.

Description
Doryphora sassafras can grow to a height of 25–35 m (80–110 ft). It is a straight-trunked tree generally with a small crown, its grey-brown trunk reaching a diameter of 1.2 m (4 ft). Oppositely arranged on the stem, the green leaves are elliptic to lanceolate or ovate, usually 7–10 cm (3–4 in) long, 2–4 cm wide, margins are shallowly to deeply toothed, glabrous and glossy, with a pleasant 'sassafras' scent when crushed. They have a prominent midrib and veins on the paler underside. Perhaps their most noteworthy feature is their lifespan; up to twelve years for each leaf. The small white flowers occur in groups of three on short axillary stalks from May to July, and are followed by dark brown hairy fruit which are ripe from February to August. The flowering display can be showy with flowers massed on branches. contrasting against the darker foliage.

Distribution and habitat
The distribution is from Nambour in southern Queensland through eastern New South Wales to Wolumla Peak in Yurammie State Forest. It is found in temperate rainforest on basalt soils at higher elevations and sedimentary soils at lower elevations, commonly associated with Coachwood (Ceratopetalum apetalum) and native crabapple (Schizomeria ovata).

Cultivation and uses
The yellowish soft timber is used in floors, turnery, and cabinet work. It is used in reforestation but generally grows too big to be used in home gardens. It has been thought to have potential as a potted specimen. It has been planted in Dublin area in Ireland

Gallery

References

Atherospermataceae
Laurales of Australia
Trees of Australia
Flora of New South Wales